Ganga Charan Rajput (born 5 May 1960) is an Indian politician from Uttar Pradesh who belongs to the Bhartiya Janta Party.

He was born in the village of Bamohri Kalan Orai, Jalaun district, Uttar Pradesh. He was a member of the Rajya Sabha during 2010–2012 from Uttar Pradesh. He was also elected to 9th, 10th and 12th Lok Sabha from Hamirpur constituency in Uttar Pradesh.

References

1960 births
Living people
Rajya Sabha members from Uttar Pradesh
People from Jalaun district
India MPs 1989–1991
India MPs 1996–1997
India MPs 1998–1999
Bharatiya Janata Party politicians from Uttar Pradesh